The Hahellaceae are a family of Pseudomonadota in the order of Oceanospirillales.

References

Further reading 
 

Oceanospirillales